Ishaku Elisha Abbo (born in Mubi North, Nigeria) is a Nigerian politician. He is the senator representing Adamawa North Senatorial District in Adamawa State at the Nigerian 9th National Assembly. He is currently a member of All Progressives Congress (APC).

Political career
On 23 February 2019, Abbo was elected as the Senator representing Adamawa North, having polled 79,337 votes as against the incumbent senator, Binta Masi Garba.

Controversy 

In May 2019, Abbo assaulted a lady at an adult toy shop in Abuja. According to reports Abbo was allegedly called "a dunk" by the shop owner when he walked in with three ladies to purchase some toys. Video footage obtained by Premium Times shows Abbo repeatedly slapping the shop owner while his security guard makes attempt to arrest the shop owner. Abbo after assaulting the shop owner claimed he was "agitated by the sudden illness of one of his girls" and accused the shop owner of poisoning the air-conditioning system.

In September 2020, The Federal Capital Territory High Court, Maitama, dismissed the suit for lack of diligent prosecution by the police. In September 2020, the case was taken to a magistrate court in Zuba, Abuja where the law suit was re-analysed with video footage evidence of the incident. Abbo was found guilty and was ordered to pay ₦50 million to Osimibibra Warmate, the shop-owner.

Awards
Abbo was a recipient of the 'Beacon of Hope' Award presented by The Adamawa Celebrities & Achievers Awards in 2019.

References

Year of birth missing (living people)
Living people
Members of the Senate (Nigeria)
People from Adamawa State
Peoples Democratic Party (Nigeria) politicians
Political scandals in Nigeria